A total solar eclipse occurred on August 21, 1560. A solar eclipse occurs when the Moon passes between Earth and the Sun, thereby totally or partly obscuring the image of the Sun for a viewer on Earth. A total solar eclipse occurs when the Moon's apparent diameter is larger than the Sun's, blocking all direct sunlight, turning day into darkness. Totality occurs in a narrow path across Earth's surface, with the partial solar eclipse visible over a surrounding region thousands of kilometers wide. This eclipse is part of solar Saros 118.

Observations

The prediction of this solar eclipse helped to inspire Tycho Brahe's (1546–1601) interest in astronomy at the age of 13.

Christopher Clavius, wrote (In Sphaeram Ioannis de Sacro Bosco Commentarius published in 1593) "I shall cite two remarkable eclipses of the Sun, which happened in my own time and thus not long ago. One of these I observed about midday at Coimbra in Lusitania (Portugal) in the year 1559 [sic], in which the Moon was placed between my sight and the Sun with the result that it covered the whole Sun for a considerable length of time. There was darkness in some manner greater than night; neither could one see where one stepped. Stars appeared in the sky and (marvelous to behold) the birds fell down from the sky to the ground in terror of such horrid darkness."

References

External links
 NASA chart graphics
 Googlemap
 NASA Besselian elements

1560 8 21
1560 in science
1560 8 21